Territorial Council elections were held in the French overseas collectivity of Saint Martin on 18 March and 25 March 2012.

Results

References

2012 elections in France
Saint Martin
Elections in the Collectivity of Saint Martin